Ernest Rouart (24 August 1874, Paris - 27 February 1942, Paris) was a French painter, watercolorist, pastellist, engraver, and art collector.

Biography

He was one of four sons and a daughter born to the engineer and painter, Henri Rouart. His brother, was a well known politician. He began by studying mathematics; intending to enter his father's business but, like his father, he turned to painting, enlisting the aid of Edgar Degas, a family friend, who gave him lessons and advised him to copy paintings at the Louvre. He also had him experiment with older mixtures of paint, as they were prepared in the Renaissance. 

It was also Degas who introduced him to the model and future art collector, Julie Manet, daughter of the painters Berthe Morisot and Eugène Manet They married soon after, in 1900, and would have three sons.

He was an avid art collector, as was his father. In 1912, he and his siblings decided to sell their late father's collection; which went for a considerable sum. Shortly after the beginning of World War I, in 1914, he obtained permission to hold a sale of Degas' paintings. His friend, then eighty years old, had fallen on hard times and needed assistance.

After beginning his career as a painter, he held numerous exhibits; first at the Société Nationale des Beaux-Arts in 1899. He was a member of the governing committee for the Salon d'Automne. In 1932, he organized the "Exposition du Centenaire de Manet" at the Musée de l'Orangerie. Similar exhibitions followed, for Degas in 1934, and Berthe Morisot in 1941. 

He died during the German occupation of Paris, and was interred at the Cimetière de Passy.

References

Further reading 
  Dominique Bona, with contributions from Léon-Paul Fargue, David Haziot, Paul Valéry, and Frédéric Vitoux. Les Rouart, de l’impressionnisme au réalisme magique, Éditions Gallimard, Paris, 2014. 
 Sophie Monneret, L'Impressionnisme et son époque : dictionnaire international. Noms propres et communs (Vol.2), Robert Laffont, 1987,

External links 

 More works by Rouart @ ArtNet

1874 births
1942 deaths
19th-century French painters
French watercolourists
French art collectors
Painters from Paris
20th-century French painters